Musaharwa is a village in West Champaran district in the Indian state of Bihar.

Demographics
As of 2011 India census, Musaharwa had a population of 2801 in 532 households. Males constitute 51.4% of the population and females 48.5%. Musaharwa has an average literacy rate of 44%, lower than the national average of 74%: male literacy is 61.1%, and female literacy is 38.8%. In Musaharwa, 22.3% of the population is under six years of age.

References

Villages in West Champaran district